The 24th Chess Olympiad, organized by FIDE and comprising an open and a women's tournament, as well as several other events designed to promote the game of chess, took place between November 20 and December 6, 1980, in Valletta, Malta.

Once again, the defending champions Hungary proved to be a real match for the Soviet favourites. The Hungarians led the table until the last round, but in the end the two teams tied for first place. The Soviet Union had a slightly better tie break score and took back the gold medals after six years. Yugoslavia completed the medal ranks.

The Soviet team was captained by the reigning world champion Karpov (who fell ill during the tournament and didn't perform to his usual standard) and featured a former champion (Tal) as well as a future one: 17-year-old Olympic debutant Kasparov, who in his first appearance took a bronze medal on the 2nd reserve board.

Open event

A total of 81 nations played a 14-round Swiss system tournament. To make for an even number of teams, the Maltese hosts also fielded a "B" team. In the event of a draw, the tie-break was decided first by using the Buchholz system, then by match points.

{| class="wikitable"
|+ Open event
! # !! Country !! Players !! Averagerating !! Points !! Buchholz !! MP
|-
| style="background:gold;"|1 ||  || Karpov, Polugaevsky, Tal, Geller, Balashov, Kasparov || 2666 || 39 || 449.5 || 
|-
| style="background:silver;"|2 ||  || Portisch, Ribli, Sax, Csom, Faragó, Pintér || 2593 || 39 || 448.0 || 
|-
| style="background:#cc9966;"|3 ||  || Ljubojević, Ivkov, Parma, Kurajica, Marjanović, Nikolić || 2541 || 35 || || 
|-
| 4 ||  || Alburt, Seirawan, Christiansen, Tarjan, de Firmian, Shamkovich || 2514 || 34 ||  || 
|-
| 5 ||  || Hort, Smejkal, Jansa, Plachetka, Ftáčnik, Lechtýnský || 2530 || 33 ||  || 
|-
| 6 ||  || Miles, Stean, Nunn, Speelman, Keene, Mestel || 2520 || 32½ || 453.0 || 
|-
| 7 ||  || Sznapik, W. Schmidt, Kuligowski, Bielczyk, Pokojowczyk, Przewoźnik || 2419 || 32½ || 424.0 || 
|-
| 8 ||  || Liberzon, Birnboim, Y. Gruenfeld, Murey, Kagan, D. Bernstein || 2474 || 32 || 439.0 || 
|-
| 9 ||  || Hébert, Day, Yanofsky, Vukadinov, Vranesic, Allan || 2385 || 32 || 410.5 || 
|-
| 10 ||  || Timman, Sosonko, Ree, Langeweg, van der Wiel, Ligterink || 2533 || 31½ || 449.5 || 
|-
| 11 ||  || Gheorghiu, Ciocâltea, Șubă, Ghindă, Ghițescu, Stoica || 2503 || 31½ || 437.5 || 
|-
| 12 ||  || Andersson, L. Karlsson, Schneider, Schüssler, Wedberg, Renman || 2473 || 31½ || 434.0 || 
|-
| 13 ||  || García Gonzáles, García Martínez, Rodríguez Céspedes, Nogueiras, Hernández, Vera González || 2468 || 31½ || 424.5 || 
|-
| 14 ||  || Quinteros, Rubinetti, Debarnot, Schweber, Giardelli, Hase || 2454 || 31 || 439.0 || 
|-
| 15 ||  || Torre, Mascariñas, R. Rodríguez, Pacis, Bernal, Ramos || 2390 || 31 || 430.5 || 
|-
| 16 ||  || Jakobsen, Høi, Fedder, Mortensen, Øst-Hansen, Pedersen || 2408 || 31 || 427.5 || 
|-
| 17 ||  || Haïk, Giffard, Seret, L. Roos, Goldenberg, D. Roos || 2381 || 31 || 415.0 || 
|-
| 18 ||  || Williams, Cooper, Hutchings, Jones, Johnston || 2325 || 31 || 395.0 || 
|-
| 19 ||  || Ermenkov, Tringov, Radulov, Georgiev, Popov, Spasov || 2473 || 30½ || 454.0 || 
|-
| 20 ||  || Westerinen, Rantanen, Hurme, Ristoja, Mäki, Pirttimäki || 2401 || 30½ || 431.0 || 
|-
| 21 ||  || Robatsch, Hölzl, Herzog, Roth, Wittmann, Wagner || 2381 || 30½ || 414.0 || 
|-
| 22 ||  || Tóth, Zichichi, Taruffi, Passerotti, Trabattoni, Iannaccone || 2334 || 30½ || 409.0 || 
|-
| 23 ||  || F. Ólafsson, H. Ólafsson, Árnason, Pétursson, Hjartarson, Jóhannsson || 2474 || 30 || 434.5 || 
|-
| 24 ||  || Helmers, Heim, Hoen, Moen, Tiller, Sande || 2369 || 30 || 421.5 || 
|-
| 25 ||  || Pfleger, Hecht, Borik, Lobron, Hermann, Kunsztowicz || 2451 || 30 || 420.0 || 
|-
| 26 ||  || Díez del Corral, Bellón López, Pomar, Rivas Pastor, Sanz Alonso, Gómez Esteban || 2425 || 30 || 416.5 || 
|-
| 27 ||  || Makropoulos, Skembris, Skalkotas, Pountsas, Natsis, Trikaliotis || 2365 || 30 || 402.5 || 
|-
| 28 ||   || Ostos, Fernández, Palacios, Dounia, Escalante || 2311 || 30 || 399.5 || 
|-
| 29 ||  || Sunye Neto, Carvalho, Lucena, van Riemsdijk, Câmara, Gentil || 2374 || 30 || 397.0 || 
|-
| 30 ||  || Catalan, Hakki, Beitar, Arafeh, Kassabe || 2235 || 30 || 394.5 || 
|-
| 31 ||  || Hug, Wirthensohn, Huss, Hammer, Züger, Franzoni || 2391 || 29½ ||  || 
|-
| 32 ||  || García, Zapata, Castro, Cuartas, Acosta, González Rodríguez || 2423 || 29 || 419.0 || 
|-
| 33 ||  || Muço, Adhami, Pustina, Zadrima, Qendro, Karkanaqe || 2319 || 29 || 415.5 || 
|-
| 34 ||  || Rogers, Jamieson, Johansen, Fuller, Shaw, West || 2361 || 29 || 410.5 || 
|-
| 35 ||  || Ravisekhar, Ravikumar, Khan, Meetei, Hassan || 2325 || 29 || 410.0 || 
|-
| 36 ||  || Morovic, Campos Moreno, Cifuentes, Silva Sánchez, Donoso Velasco, Velasquez Ojeda || 2388 || 29 || 408.5 || 
|-
| 37 ||  || Frey Beckman, Campos López, Félix Villarreal, Maya, Ocampo, Navarro || 2359 || 29 || 396.0 || 
|-
| 38 ||  || Liu Wenzhe, Qi Jingxuan, Liang Jinrong, Li Zunian, Tang Hongjian || 2380 || 28½ || 411.5 || 
|-
| 39 ||  || Silva, Fernandes, J. Santos, L. Santos, Durão || 2351 || 28½ || 406.0 || 
|-
| 40 ||  || Meulders, De Bruycker, Deleyn, Goormachtigh, Defize, Schumacher || 2233 || 28½ || 395.0 || 
|-
| 41 ||  || Delaney, Dunne, Doyle, Ludgate, Curtin, McCarthy || 2255 || 28½ || 391.5 || 
|-
| 42 ||  || Chaivichit, Sinprayoon, Trisa-Ard, Darakorn || 2225 || 28½ || 390.0 || 
|-
| 43 ||  || Mirza, Farooqui, Zafar, Chaudry, Ahmad, Rana || 2238 || 28½ || 372.5 || 
|-
| 44 ||  || Álvarez, Abreu, Gonzáles, Mateo, Pérez Nivar || 2258 || 28 || 399.0 || 
|-
| 45 ||  || Handoko, Suradiradja, Arif, Ardiansyah, Gunawan, Kusnadi || 2354 || 28 || 397.5 || 
|-
| 46 ||  || Myagmarsuren, Tumurbator, Jigjidsuren, Lhagva || 2328 || 27½ || 402.5 || 
|-
| 47 ||  || Gamarra Cáceres, Ferreira, Bogda, Santacruz || 2255 || 27½ || 387.0 || 
|-
| 48 ||  || İpek, Gümrükçüoğlu, Öney, Süer, Pamuk || 2259 || 27½ || 384.5 || 
|-
| 49 ||  || Liew Chee Meng, Foo Lum Choon, Chang Hing Wah, Cheah Woon Leng, Abdul Rahman || 2200 || 27½ || 378.0 || 
|-
| 50 ||  || Lee, Raphael, Duchesne, Lee, Mohipp, Ramon-Fortune || 2200 || 27½ || 370.5 || 
|-
| 51 ||  || Pritchett, Swanson, Upton, McNab, Norris, Bonner || 2291 || 27 || 423.5 || 
|-
| 52 ||  || Gonda, Takemoto, T. Shiraki, Sakurai, T. Hirata, Sugimoto || 2213 || 27 || 373.0 || 
|-
| 53 ||  || M. Broomes, G. Broomes, Wharton, R. Austin, J. Macedo || 2203 || 26½ || 369.0 || 13
|-
| 54 ||  || Haas, Feller, Stull, Schammo, Specchio, Kirsch || 2230 || 26½ || 369.0 || 12
|-
| 55 ||  || Baghli, Cherrad, Slimani, Kharchi, R. Bounedjar, Belamine || 2200 || 26½ || 351.0 || 
|-
| 56 ||  || Chandler, Sarapu, Small, Aptekar, Anderson || 2336 || 26 || 401.0 || 
|-
| 57 ||  || Kouatly, Sursock, Abouchaaya, Khechen, N. Saade || 2243 || 26 || 389.5 || 
|-
| 58 ||  || Bouaziz, Belkadi, Hmadi, Ouechtati, Doghri, L. Hamzaoui || 2279 || 26 || 387.5 || 
|-
| 59 ||  || Soliman, Fatin, El-Said, Afifi, Sadek, Hamed || 2200 || 25½ || 391.0 || 
|-
| 60 ||  || N. A. Said, S. A. Said, N. M. Said, Ghubash, Qasim, Saleh || 2200 || 25½ || 379.0 || 
|-
| 61 ||  || Attard, Camilleri, Gouder, Sollars, Gauci, G. Borg || 2226 || 25½ || 376.5 || 
|-
| 62 ||  || Donnely, Barlow, V. Strugo, Levy, Kuwaza, T. Klement || 2200 || 25½ || 369.5 || 
|-
| 63 ||  || M. Colón Romero, Ochoa, Moraza Choisme, Vázquez Ramos, Sosa, Falcón || 2201 || 25½ || 357.0 || 
|-
| - ||  "B" || Cilia Vincenti, Vella Gera, Psaila, Thake, Vasallo, A. Borg || 2200 || 25½ || 355.5 || 
|-
| 64 ||  || Wheeler, Powell, A. Niederhoffer, Cameron || 2200 || 25½ || 348.5 || 
|-
| 65 ||  || Van Tilbury, R. Grim, Grumer, Turner, Chiu Yum San, D. Delzell || 2233 || 25½ || 333.0 || 
|-
| 66 ||  || Kan Wai Shui, Lin, Chao, Luk Luen Wah, M. Camm, R. Murphy || 2235 || 25 || 349.0 || 
|-
| 67 ||  || Fulton, Blow, Newman, Knight, Lainé, Bisson || 2200 || 25 || 345.0 || 
|-
| 68 ||  || S. Bukhari, Bakr, M. Bukhari, Kilani, Arafat || 2200 || 25 || 323.5 || 
|-
| 69 ||  || Martidis, Riza, Aristotelous, Hadjiyiannis, Kleopas || 2200 || 24½ || 356.0 || 
|-
| 70 ||  || Kanani, Adam, Yongo, Donde, Kinyanjui, S. Oulo || 2200 || 24½ || 318.5 || 
|-
| 71 ||  || Omuku, Agusto, O. Faseyitan, E. Awobokun, O. Ayoola || 2200 || 23½ || 361.0 || 
|-
| 72 ||  || Ziska, Apol, Vilhelm, Midjord, Joensen || 2200 || 24½ || 355.0 || 
|-
| 73 ||  || Santamaría Mas, Clua Ballague, J. A. Pantebre Martínez, De la Casa, Gómez Abad, B. Pantebre Martínez || 2200 || 23½ || 345.5 || 
|-
| 74 ||  || M. Hingary, Tawengi, El-Mejbri, Benohman, Ali Dreibika, Talha || 2200 || 23½ || 344.0 || 
|-
| 75 ||  || Hook, Jarecki, Georges, Solomon || 2216 || 23½ || 326.0 || 
|-
| 76 ||  || Wojciechowski, Harris, Radford, Chudleigh, Dill, Tee || 2200 || 23 || 326.0 || 
|-
| 77 ||  || De Vries, Ciezkowski, Buysschaert, Callens, Claeys || 2200 || 23 || 319.5 || 
|-
| 78 ||  || Caruana, Negro, Girault, Lepine, Bernard, Angles d'Auriac || 2200 || 20½ ||  || 
|-
| 79 ||  || B. Whyte, F. Conejares, Hothersall, Markov, Marko, Puru || 2200 || 19½ ||  || 
|-
| 80 ||  || Zabasajja, O. Musasira, Mungyereza, Kisubi, Kamuhangire, Kiiza || 2200 || 17½ ||  || 
|-
| 81 ||  || Fonseca de Oliveira, Adão Domingos, De Meireles, Ferreira, V. Marques Alves, Saraiva de Carvalho || 2200 || 13½ ||  || 
|}

Individual medals

 Board 1:  William Hook 11½/14 = 82.1%
 Board 2:  Yrjö Rantanen 9½/13 = 73.1%
 Board 3:  José Félix Villarreal 9/11 = 81.8%
 Board 4:  István Csom 7/9 = 77.8%
 1st reserve:  Yury Balashov (7½/10) and  Bjørn Tiller (6/8) = 75.0%
 2nd reserve:  Predrag Nikolić 6½/8 = 81.3%

Best game

The 'Best Game' prize went to Jonathan Mestel (England) - Nils Gustaf Renman (Sweden) from round 13.

Women's event

42 teams took part in the women's event which for the first time was played as a 14-round Swiss system tournament. In the event of a draw, the tie-break was decided first by using the Buchholz system, then by match points.

Like the open event, the women's tournament proved to be a tight affair between the Soviet Union and Hungary, with the Soviet team, captained by world champion Chiburdanidze, winning by half a point. Poland took the bronze.

{| class="wikitable"
! # !! Country !! Players !! Averagerating !! Points !! Buchholz !! MP !! Head-to-head
|-
| style="background:gold;"|1 ||  || Chiburdanidze, Gaprindashvili, Alexandria, Ioseliani || 2370 || 32½ || || || 
|-
| style="background:silver;"|2 ||  || Verőci-Petronić, Ivánka, Porubszky-Angyalosine, Csonkics || 2232 || 32 || || || 
|-
| style="background:#cc9966;"|3 ||  || Ereńska-Radzewska, Szmacińska, Wiese, Brustman || 2148 || 26½ || || || 
|-
| 4 ||  || Polihroniade, Baumstark, Nuțu, Mureșan || 2200 || 26 ||  ||  || 
|-
| 5 ||  || Fischdick, B. Hund, Laakmann, I. Hund || 2152 || 24 || 339.5 ||  || 
|-
| 6 ||  || Liu Shilan, Wu Mingqian, An Yangfeng || 1843 || 24 || 338.5 ||  || 
|-
| 7 ||  || Glaz, Kristol, Podrazhanskaya, Nudelman || 2113 || 23½ || 339.5 ||  || 
|-
| 8 ||  || Marković, Dragašević, Štadler, Prokopović || 2142 || 23½ || 333.5 ||  || 
|-
| 9 ||  || Lematschko, Bojadjieva, Voyska, Angelova || 2138 || 23 || 340.0 ||  || 
|-
| 10 ||  || Abreu Carvalho, Chaves, Cardoso, Longo || 1850 || 23 || 300.5 ||  || 
|-
| 11 ||  || García Vicente, Ferrer Lucas, García Padrón, Cuevas Rodríguez || 2122 || 22½ || 331.0 ||  || 
|-
| 12 ||  || Soppe, Arias, Justo, Vázquez || 1913 || 22½ || 314.0 ||  || 
|-
| 13 ||  || Savereide, Crotto, Haring, Frenkel || 2092 || 22 || 334.0 ||  || 
|-
| 14 ||  || Miles, Jackson, Caldwell, Whitehead || 2160 || 22 || 332.5 ||  || 
|-
| 15 ||  || Merlini, Ruck-Petit, Schall, Legendre || 1942 || 22 || 312.5 ||  || 
|-
| 16 ||  || Mott-McGrath, Hawkesworth, Slavotinek, Martin || 1870 || 22 || 302.5 ||  || 
|-
| 17 ||  || Vreeken, Belle, van Parreren, Bruinenberg || 2092 || 21½ || 323.0 ||  || 
|-
| 18 ||  || Guggenberger, Leyva, Maya de Alzate, Patiño || 1888 || 21½ || 311.0 ||  || 
|-
| 19 ||  || Shterenberg, Roos, Das, Day || 1938 || 21½ || 305.0 || 15 || 2½
|-
| 20 ||  || Pernici, Gramignani, Merciai, Deghenghi || 1935 || 21½ || 305.0 || 15 || ½
|-
| 21 ||  || Borisova-Ornstein, Aatolainen, Nyberg, Samuelsson || 1962 || 21½ || 297.5 ||  || 
|-
| 22 ||  || Kristinsdóttir, Tráinsdóttir, Friðþjófsdóttir, Norðdahl || 1800 || 21½ || 279.0 ||  || 
|-
| 23 ||  || García Portes, A. R. Marino, Cuevas || 1800 || 21½ || 263.5 ||  || 
|-
| 24 ||  || Fouriki, A. Efremoglou, Petraki, K. Mihailidou || 1800 || 21½ || 253.0 ||  || 
|-
| 25 ||  || J. Khadilkar, R. Khadilkar, V. Khadilkar, Thipsay || 2075 || 21 || 305.5 ||  || 
|-
| 26 ||  || Cronin, Delaney, O'Siochrú, Connolly || 1818 || 21 || 287.5 ||  || 
|-
| 27 ||  || Garwell, Evans, James, Brunker || 1930 || 21 || 277.0 ||  || 
|-
| 28 ||  || Hindle, Elder, Jackson, Houstoun || 1817 || 20½ || 286.0 ||  || 
|-
| 29 ||  || Foster, Stretch, Brightwell, Flower || 1800 || 20½ || 239.0 ||  || 
|-
| 30 ||  || Thygesen, Haahr, Berg, Larsen || 1875 || 20 || 291.5 ||  || 
|-
| 31 ||  || Veprek, Bürgin, Schladetzky, Meyer || 1907 || 20 || 279.0 ||  || 
|-
| 32 ||  || Camps de Ocampo, Salazar, Escondrillas || 1827 || 20 || 233.0 ||  || 
|-
| 33 ||  || Hennings, Hausner, Samt, Kattinger || 1938 || 19½ || 291.0 ||  || 
|-
| 34 ||  || Sirkka-Liisa Landry, Palasto, Laitinen, Pihlajamäki || 1900 || 19½ || 283.0 ||  || 
|-
| 35 ||  || Basta Sohair, Izmael, A. Samy Maha, Ibrahim || 1800 || 19½ || 234.0 ||  || 
|-
| 36 ||  || Takahashi, Watai, Nakagawa || 1817 || 19 || 283.0 ||  || 
|-
| 37 ||  || Careme, De Corte, Schumacher, Loo || 1800 || 19 || 235.0 ||  || 
|-
| 38 ||  || Grech-Sollars, Sciortino, Lentini, Fiott || 1800 || 15 ||  ||  || 
|-
| 39 ||  || Rodríguez Ramírez, Irizarry Adequin, Latorre Vélez, Martorell Martínez || 1800 || 14½ ||  ||  || 
|-
| 40 ||  || Ahmad, N. Saleh, Karim, Hassan || 1800 || 13½ ||  ||  || 
|-
| 41 ||  || Widmer, Quenzel, Grumer || 1800 || 4 ||  ||  || 
|-
| 42 ||  || Isong, Olusola || 1800 || 1 ||  ||  || 
|}

Individual medals

 Board 1:  Maia Chiburdanidze 11½ / 13 = 88.5%
 Board 2:  Nona Gaprindashvili 9½ / 12 = 79.2%
 Board 3:  Daniela Nuţu 7½ / 10 = 75.0%
 Reserve:  Nana Ioseliani 7½ / 9 = 83.3%

References

24th Chess Olympiad: La Valletta 1980 OlimpBase

24
Women's Chess Olympiads
Olympiad 24
Olympiad 24
Chess Olympiad 24
Chess Olympiad 24
20th century in Valletta